The Michigan State Spartans women's basketball team is the intercollegiate women's basketball program representing Michigan State University. The school competes in the Big Ten Conference in Division I of the National Collegiate Athletic Association (NCAA). The Spartans play home basketball games at the Breslin Student Events Center on the university campus in East Lansing, Michigan.

History
The Spartans began play in 1972. In 1991, the Spartans made their first ever NCAA Division I women's basketball tournament, their first postseason appearance since the 1977 AIAW women's basketball tournament. In 2005, the Spartans won 33 games (a school record), advancing all the way to the NCAA Division I women's basketball tournament championship, before losing 84–62 to Baylor. The Spartans have been to 14 NCAA Tournaments in the past 25 years, the most recent being in 2021.

Coaching history

Postseason results

NCAA Division I
The Spartans have made 18 appearances in the NCAA Division I women's basketball tournament. Their combined record is 20–18.

† The Spartans received a bye into the Second Round.

AIAW Division I
The Spartans made one appearance in the AIAW National Division I basketball tournament, with a combined record of 0–2.

Big Ten Medal of Honor
 1983 – Karen Wells
 1985 – Kelly Belanger
 1986 – Julie Polakowski
 1990 – Eileen Shea
 2006 – Liz Shimek
 2010 – Allyssa DeHaan

Big Ten Coach of the Year
 1988 – Karen Langeland
 2005 – Joanne P. McCallie
 2011 – Suzy Merchant

References

External links